Cornerpost Peak is a peak,  high, at the southeast end of Leitch Massif in the Concord Mountains, Victoria Land, Antarctica. The topographical feature was so named by the northern party of the New Zealand Federated Mountain Clubs Antarctic Expedition (NZFMCAE), 1962–63, because they established their most northerly survey station here on the turning point of their traverse. The peak lies situated on the Pennell Coast, a portion of Antarctica lying between Cape Williams and Cape Adare.

References
 

Mountains of Victoria Land
Pennell Coast